Camille Richardson (born 15 January 1976) is a Dutch former basketball player. He played for Dutch Basketball League clubs Stepco BSW, Bergen op Zoom, Omniworld Almere and Den Bosch Basketball during the 1999-2007 seasons. Richardson had 5 caps for the Netherlands national basketball team during the 2004-2005 season.

Business
In 2013 Richardson founded a company together with Serge Brabander called OneFit B.V.. It is an internet platform that provides a monthly all in one subscription with access to gyms, yoga studios, swimming pools and a variety of other training facilities. It currently operates in several cities in The Netherlands, Germany and Spain.

References

External links
 eurobasket.com profile

1976 births
Living people
BSW (basketball club) players
Almere Pioneers players
Heroes Den Bosch players
West-Brabant Giants players
Dutch Basketball League players
Dutch men's basketball players
Small forwards
Sportspeople from 's-Hertogenbosch